Sawin is a settlement in Chełm County, Lublin Voivodeship, in eastern Poland. It is the seat of the gmina (administrative district) called Gmina Sawin.

The settlement has a population of 2,181.

Jewish Community 
The first Jewish synagogue was built in Sawin on Brzeskiej Street in the early 1880s. A second synagogue was built in 1925 when the
611 Jews living in the village represented 48% of total population. There were 882 Jews living in the village at the start of World War II. They included 157 traders and salesmen, 75 craftsmen, and 250 laborers.

The Jewish cemetery on the outskirts of the village, on a street called Chuteckiej, was vandalized in 1943. In 1999, Mordechai Holcblat, a Sawin native living in Israel, rectified a wooden fence. In 2001, Philip Goldstejn, a Sawin native from Canada, and Mr. Holcblat from Israel created a Holocaust memorial on stone brought from Israel. They had the cemetery cleaned and the remaining gravestones were reset.

The Holocaust 
The Nazis destroyed both synagogues and created a slave labor camp in November 1940 for local Jews and others from Kraków, Czechoslovakia, France, Austria, and Yugoslavia. They built drainage ditches and later were sent to extermination camps. Sawin's labor camp was closed on December 9, 1943, marching prisoners to Sobibor.

Sawin was the site of a Jewish forced labor camp established by the Germans for the purpose of improving water for the area. This camp had between 700 and 800 Jewish workers.

References 

Villages in Chełm County
Ruthenian Voivodeship
Kholm Governorate
Lublin Voivodeship (1919–1939)
Holocaust locations in Poland